Sarukkai is a village in the Papanasam taluk of Thanjavur district, Tamil Nadu, India.

Demographics 

As per the 2001 census, Sarukkai had a total population of 2432 with 1238 males and 1194 females. The sex ratio was 964. The literacy rate was 62.64.

References 

 

Villages in Thanjavur district